Athanasius IV was Ecumenical Patriarch of Constantinople (July 30–August 10, 1679).

References

Sources
 Εγκυκλοπαίδεια Πάπυρος-Larousse-Britannica, 2007, Vol. 2, pp. 651–652

17th-century Ecumenical Patriarchs of Constantinople
Year of birth missing
Year of death missing
Place of birth missing